Rooster in My Rari is a song by American rapper Waka Flocka Flame from his second studio album, Triple F Life: Friends, Fans & Family (2012). The song was written by Waka Flocka Flame and DJ Spinz; the latter also produced the song. It was released on May 28, 2012 as a promotional single from the album.

Music video
On June 11, 2012, the music video was released for "Rooster In My Rari".

Charts

References

2012 songs
Waka Flocka Flame songs
Songs written by DJ Spinz
Songs written by Waka Flocka Flame